Lebanon is a town in the Greater Accra Region of Ghana and shares boundary with Ashaiman and Zenu. The town is divided into zones, from zone 1 to 5.

References 

Populated places in the Greater Accra Region